Udrea is a Romanian name and surname that may refer to:

 Udrea Băleanu (died ca. 1601), Wallachian statesman and military leader
 Elena Udrea (born 1973), Romanian politician
 Maria Udrea (born 1990), Romanian épée fencer

See also 
 Udrești (disambiguation)

Romanian-language surnames